Julio César Miranda (born May 19, 1980), is a Mexican professional boxer and the former WBO Flyweight champion.

Professional career

Miranda began his professional career on August 19, 2000, with a unanimous decision win over Antonio Garibay. He won the vacant title by defeating Richie Mepranum on June 12, 2010, by a 5th round TKO.

Professional boxing record

See also
List of Mexican boxing world champions
List of flyweight boxing champions

References

External links

1980 births
Living people
Flyweight boxers
Bantamweight boxers
World flyweight boxing champions
World Boxing Organization champions
Mexican male boxers
Boxers from Veracruz